Maju dan Sejahtera (Progress and Prosper) is the official anthem of the Federal Territories of Malaysia. The anthem was adopted on 12 August 2006. On 28 January 2011, the new anthem and lyrics for the  Federal Territories were launched.

Old anthem (2006 - 2011)

The old canticle of the Federal Territories was entirely composed by Datuk Wah Idris, both in 2006.

Lyrics

New anthem (2011 - present)

The new song was composed by Syed Indera Syed Omar and composed by Suhaimi Mohd Zain, both in 2011.

Lyrics

References

External links 
Old anthem for Federal Territory (2006–2011)
New anthem for Federal Territory (2011–present)

Federal Territories in Malaysia
Regional songs
Anthems of Malaysia